Unicorn Ridge is a mountain in Hong Kong at  in height. It is one of the Eight Mountains of the Kowloon Ridge and falls within Lion Rock Country Park. Sha Tin Pass lies between Unicorn Ridge and Temple Hill.

The summit of Unicorn Ridge is just above MacLehose Trail, west of Sha Tin Pass.

See also 
 Gin Drinkers Line
 Eight Mountains of Kowloon

References 

Sha Tin District